Harry Hodgkinson may refer to:
 Harry Hodgkinson (footballer) (1862–1945), English footballer
 Harry Hodgkinson (writer) (1913–1994), British writer, journalist, naval intelligence officer and expert on the Balkans

See also
 Hodgkinson